Aleksei Aleksandrovich Solosin (born 11 August 1987) is a Russian former professional football goalkeeper.

Club career
He made his professional debut in the Russian First Division in 2005 for FC Spartak Chelyabinsk.

On 11 June 2017, he signed a two-year contract with FC Anzhi Makhachkala. On 14 December 2017, his Anzhi contract was dissolved by mutual consent.

Career statistics

Notes

References

1987 births
People from Balashikha
Living people
Russian footballers
Russian expatriate footballers
Russia youth international footballers
Association football goalkeepers
FC Fakel Voronezh players
FC Chernomorets Novorossiysk players
FC Ural Yekaterinburg players
FC Sibir Novosibirsk players
Russian Premier League players
FC Dynamo Barnaul players
FC SKA-Khabarovsk players
FC Tom Tomsk players
FC Anzhi Makhachkala players
FC Spartak Moscow players
FC Saturn Ramenskoye players
FC Khimki players
FC Kolkheti-1913 Poti players
FC Noah players
Russian expatriate sportspeople in Georgia (country)
Russian expatriate sportspeople in Armenia
Expatriate footballers in Georgia (country)
Expatriate footballers in Armenia
Armenian Premier League players
FC Spartak Nizhny Novgorod players
Sportspeople from Moscow Oblast